Series 16 of British television drama The Bill consisted of 86 episodes, broadcast between 4 January – 26 December 2000. As well as 83 regular episodes, the series also included a two-part recap special, Kiss Off, featuring a condensed broadcast of the Series 15 episodes "Lone Ranger", "Old Flame", "Push It" and "Kiss Off", prior to a special episode, The Trial of Eddie Santini, which provides closure to the Santini storyline from 1999. On 5 June 2013, The Bill Series 16 Part 1 & 2 and The Bill Series 16 Part 3 & 4 DVD sets were released (in Australia).

On screen, it was revealed in the spring that DS Claire Stanton, introduced in the previous season, was working as a mole in CID for the Complaints Investigation Bureau to bring down DS Don Beech. The storyline stretched five months and reached a denouement when DS John Boulton was murdered by Beech. The climax, however, wouldn't happen until the following series when Beech surfaced in Australia. The storyline saw CID obliterated, with DCI Jack Meadows and DCs Duncan Lennox, Danny Glaze and Mickey Webb the only characters left in CID. Chief Superintendent Charles Brownlow also exited during the Beech saga, ending a 16-year stint on the show for actor Peter Ellis; however he would go on to make a guest appearance in 2002. Ellis' final episode, All Fall Down: Part 1, was written by his son Hugh. As a result of the CID exodus, five new officers were introduced to the department, as well as a new station commander, Tom Chandler. By the series finale, Brownlow was the only Chief Superintendent to run Sun Hill. Each station commander that succeeded Brownlow held the rank of Superintendent, with Chief Superintendent reserved for the Borough Commanders. In addition to the death of Boulton, the murder of DS Rosie Fox saw the first death of a main character in the series since PC Cathy Marshall in 1996.

DCI Frank Burnside made his final appearance in the series proper in January after getting an ill-fated spinoff that would only end up lasting for one series; Burnside aired in the spring of 2000.

Cast changes

Arrivals
 DC Mickey Webb (Episode 25-)
 PC Ben Hayward (Episode 60-)
 PC Roz Clarke (Episode 60-)
 Supt Tom Chandler (Episode 73-)
 DI Alex Cullen (Episode 73-)
 DS Debbie McAllister (Episode 73-)
 DS Vik Singh (Episode 73-)
 DC Kate Spears (Episode 73-)
 DC Paul Riley (Episode 73-)

Departures

 DC Rod Skase – Resigns before dismissal for negligence
 DC Tom Proctor – Transferred to Isleworth CSU
 DS John Boulton – Murdered by DS Beech
 Ch Supt Charles Brownlow – Resigns and retires in wake of the Beech scandal
 DC Kerry Holmes – Voluntarily transfers after being accused of being part of the Beech scandal
 DI Chris Deakin – Forced to transfer due to Beech scandal
 DS Geoff Daly – Forced to transfer after Beech scandal
 DS Don Beech – Goes on the run after killing DS Boulton 
 DS Claire Stanton – Returns to CIB after conclusion of Beech scandal
 PC Gary McCann – Transfers to another station after receiving promotion as sergeant

Episodes
{| class="wikitable plainrowheaders" style="width:100%; margin:auto; background:#FFFFFF;"
|-style="color:#7CC"
! style="background-color:#005555;" width="20"|No.
! style="background-color:#005555;" width="150"|Title
! style="background-color:#005555;" width="230"|Episode notes
! style="background-color:#005555;" width="140"|Directed by
! style="background-color:#005555;" width="150"|Written by
! style="background-color:#005555;" width="100"|Original air date

|}

References

2000 British television seasons
The Bill series